Hale's Location is a township in Carroll County, New Hampshire, United States. The population was 132 at the 2020 census. In New Hampshire, locations, grants, townships (which are different from towns), and purchases are unincorporated portions of a county which are not part of any town and have limited self-government (if any, as many are uninhabited).

Geography

Demographics

At the 2000 census there were 58 people, 29 households, and 26 families living in the location. The population density was 23.9 people per square mile (9.2/km). There were 65 housing units at an average density of 26.8 per square mile (10.3/km).  The racial makeup of the location was 100.00% White.
Of the 29 households 3.4% had children under the age of 18 living with them, 89.7% were married couples living together, 3.4% had a female householder with no husband present, and 6.9% were non-families. 6.9% of households were one person and 3.4% were one person aged 65 or older. The average household size was 2.00 and the average family size was 2.07.

The age distribution was 3.4% under the age of 18, 6.9% from 25 to 44, 44.8% from 45 to 64, and 44.8% 65 or older. The median age was 64 years. For every 100 females, there were 93.3 males. For every 100 females age 18 and over, there were 100.0 males.

The median household income was $32,188 and the median family income  was $44,167. Males had a median income of $100,000 versus $18,750 for females. The per capita income for the location was $25,103. None of the population was below the poverty line.

Emergency services 
Police services are provided by the Carroll County Sheriff's Office or NH State Police Troop E depending on staffing for the time of day.

References

Townships in Carroll County, New Hampshire
Townships in New Hampshire